Lieutenant-General Sir Edward Peter Strickland  (3 August 1869 – 24 June 1951) was a British Army officer who commanded 1st Division during the First World War.

Military career
Educated at Warwick School, Strickland was commissioned into the Norfolk Regiment in 1888 and served in Upper Burma in 1888/1889, on the Dongola expedition in 1896 and fighting at the Battle of Atbara and the Battle of Omdurman in 1898. He served in North Nigeria from 1906 and commanded the North Nigeria Regiment in 1909. He served in the First World War as Commanding Officer of 1st Bn the Manchester Regiment from 1914 and as Commander of the Jullundur brigade from early 1915 leading it at the Battle of Neuve Chapelle and at the Second Battle of Ypres. He continued his war service as Commander of the 98th Brigade from late 1915 and then as General Officer Commanding 1st Division on the Western Front from 1916 until the end of the War leading it at the Battle of the Somme and the Battle of Lys.

After the War he became Commander of the Western Division of the British Army of the Rhine and then General Officer Commanding 6th Division in Ireland in which role he survived an assassination attempt by the Irish Republican Army in Cork in September 1920 before assuming the additional responsibilities of military governor for the counties of Munster, Kilkenny and Wexford in January 1921. He was appointed General Officer Commanding 2nd Division in 1923 and General Officer Commanding the British Troops in Egypt in 1927 before retiring in 1931.

From 1917 to 1946 he was the Colonel of the Norfolk Regiment.

Family
In 1918 he married Barbara Cresswell (née Ffolkes); they had a daughter, and there were two daughters from his wife's previous marriage, including Billa Harrod. Barbara Strickland was created a Dame Commander of the Order of the British Empire (DBE) in 1923.

Honours
 Distinguished Service Order – 1899
 Commander of the Order of St Michael and St George – 1913
 Knight Companion of the Order of the Bath - 1919 (Companion (CB) 1917)
 Knight Commander of the Order of the British Empire - 1923
 Third class, Order of Medjidie – 1902 – in recognition of valuable services rendered to Hs Highness the Khedive of Egypt

References

|-

|-

|-

1869 births
1951 deaths
British Army lieutenant generals
British Army generals of World War I
Knights Commander of the Order of the Bath
Knights Commander of the Order of the British Empire
Companions of the Order of St Michael and St George
Companions of the Distinguished Service Order
People educated at Warwick School
Royal Norfolk Regiment officers
Military personnel from Warwickshire